The Lady Margaret Professorship of Divinity is a senior professorship in Christ Church of the University of Oxford. The professorship was founded from the benefaction of Lady Margaret Beaufort (1443–1509), mother of Henry VII. Its holders were all priests until 2015, when Carol Harrison, a lay theologian, was appointed to the chair.

List of chair holders

See also
Lady Margaret's Professor of Divinity at the University of Cambridge
List of professorships at the University of Oxford.

Notes

References
Aston, T. H. The History of the University of Oxford.  Oxford: Clarendon Press, 1994.

Lists of people associated with the University of Oxford
Divinity, Margaret, Lady
Divinity, Margaret, Lady